Feng Shunhua (May 1934 – 5 May 2019) was a Chinese economist and expert on Russian and Eastern European affairs. She was professor and Chair of World Economic Research at Liaoning University. She was a delegate to the National Congress of the Communist Party of China.

Biography 
Feng was born in Shanghai, Republic of China in May 1934. She graduated from Beijing Normal University in July 1957, and worked in Warsaw, Poland for a year.

Feng was a professor at Liaoning University, where she served as Chair of World Economic Research and Vice President of the Institute of Economic Research. She also served as Vice President of the China World Economics Society.

Her research was focused on the world economy, comparative economics, and Russian and Eastern European affairs. She published many research works and supervised more than 60 master's and doctoral students.

Feng was a delegate to the 13th and 14th National Congress of the Communist Party of China. She also served as an advisor to the national and provincial governments.

Feng died on 5 May 2019 in Shenyang, at the age of 85.

References 

1934 births
2019 deaths
Chinese women economists
Educators from Shanghai
Beijing Normal University alumni
Academic staff of Liaoning University
Chinese expatriates in Poland
Writers from Shanghai
People's Republic of China politicians from Shanghai
Economists from Shanghai